Jewish settlement in Krasnostav, Ukraine began in the 18th century.

Jewish history 
Jewish settlement in Krasnostav began in the 18th century. In 1897 there were 1,222 Jews, who comprised 55.7 percent of the total population. During an episode during the Russian civil war (1918–1920) 31 Jews were wounded. From the early 1920s a Yiddish school operated in the town.

References

External links 
 Shtetl Krasnostav: Life in Krasnostav before World War II and fate of Krasnostav Jews in documents, maps, photographs and stories at tkfgen.org
 KehilaLinks on Jewishgen

Krasnostav
Krasnostav